John Brown (29 March 1807 – 5 June 1883) was an English first-class cricketer.

Brown made a single appearance in first-class cricket for the Players of Nottinghamshire against the Gentlemen of Nottinghamshire at Trent Bridge in 1842. Batting twice in the match, Brown was dismissed for 4 runs in the Players first-innings by William Hillyer, while in their second-innings he was dismissed without scoring by Jemmy Dean. He died at Nottingham in June 1883.

References

External links

1807 births
1883 deaths
Cricketers from Nottingham
English cricketers
Players of Nottinghamshire cricketers